A teamster in American English is a truck driver; a person who drives teams of draft animals; or a member of the International Brotherhood of Teamsters, a labor union in the United States and Canada. 

Originally the term teamster meant a person who drove a team, usually of oxen, horses, or mules, pulling a wagon, replacing the earlier teamer.

This term was common by the time of the Mexican–American War (1848) and the Indian Wars throughout the 19th and early 20th centuries on the American frontier.

Another name for the occupation was bullwhacker, related to driving oxen. A teamster might also drive pack animals, such as a muletrain, in which case he was also called a muleteer or muleskinner.  Today this person may be called an outfitter or packer.

In some places, a teamster was called a carter, the name referring to the bullock cart.  In Australian English, a teamster was also called a bullocker or bullocky.

From the Revolutionary War at least through World War I, United States Army enlisted personnel responsible for transporting supplies by wagon and for the upkeep of those draft animals were called wagoners.

References

Further reading 
 Telleen, Maurice (1977), The Draft Horse Primer: A Guide to the Care and Use of Work Horses and Mules, Rodale Press, Emmaus, Pennsylvania, 
 Elser, Smoke (1980), Packin' in on Mules and Horses Mountain Press Publishing Co., Missoula, Montana, 
 Gebhards, Stacy V. (2000), When Mules Wear Diamonds: Mountain Packing with Mules and Horses Wilderness Skills, McCall, Idaho, 
 Damerow, Gail; Ainsworth, Brandt and Edmunds, Bill (2001) Driving Draft Horses, DVD, Rural Heritage Video, Cedar Rapids, Iowa, 
 Damerow, Gail and Rice, Alina (2008), Draft Horses and Mules: Harnessing Equine Power for Farm & Show, Storey Publishing, North Adams, Massachusetts, 

Transport occupations
Obsolete occupations
Animal husbandry occupations